Eddy Beugels (19 March 1944 – 12 January 2018) was a Dutch cyclist who won a silver medal in the team time trial at the 1966 UCI Road World Championships. He also won the Ronde van Noord-Holland (1966), Grand Prix de Wallonie (1968), Eschborn-Frankfurt City Loop, and one stage of the Olympia's Tour (1965). During his career that spanned seven years between 1964 and 1970 he competed three times in the Tour de France, in 1968, 1969 and 1970.

References

1944 births
2018 deaths
Dutch male cyclists
People from Schinnen
UCI Road World Championships cyclists for the Netherlands
Cyclists from Limburg (Netherlands)
Deaths from Alzheimer's disease
Tour de Suisse stage winners
20th-century Dutch people